The 25th European Kendo Championships was held in Berlin, Germany  12–14 April 2013.

Results

Medals table

Participating nations

References

External links
Official website

European Kendo Championships
Sports competitions in Berlin
2013 in German sport
2013 in Berlin
International sports competitions hosted by Germany